Ahan Shetty (born 28 December 1995) is an Indian actor who works in Hindi films. The son of actor Sunil Shetty, he began his acting career in 2021 with the action romance film Tadap which earned him the IIFA Award for Star Debut of the Year – Male.

Early life and family 
Shetty was born on 28 December 1995 in Mumbai, India. He is the son of Bollywood actor Sunil Shetty and Mana Shetty. and younger brother of actress Athiya Shetty. His father is an actor in the Bollywood industry while his mother, whose birth-name is Monisha Kadri, is a businesswoman, designer and social activist born to a Gujarati Muslim architect and a Punjabi Hindu social activist.

Career 
Shetty began his acting career with Milan Luthria directional romantic action drama film Tadap co-starring Tara Sutaria, a remake of hit Telugu action film RX 100. To prepare for the role, he put on 11 kg and having 11 to 12 meals a day. The principal photography began in April 2019 under the Nadiadwala Grandson Entertainment banner with Fox Star Studios as distributor and co-producer. The film released on December 2021 theatrically with mixed reviews from critics, while praise towards performances and action sequences but criticism towards screenplay. 

Monika Rawal Kukreja of Hindustan Times wrote, "Shetty and his character arch leaves a long impression, he makes an intense and impressive debut". While Devesh Sharma of Filmfare wrote, "He scores the most in action scenes [and] is at ease in front of the camera overall and makes a confident debut". Tadap grossed  crore and turned out to be "average" at the box office. Shetty won the IIFA Award for Star Debut of the Year – Male for his performance.

Personal life 
Shetty is in a relationship with fashion designer Tania Shroff. They have been dating each other for nearly a decade now. In fact, they both studied in the same school. The couple made their first public appearance together, where they attended Armaan Jain's wedding. During the release of Shetty's debut film, they were seen together at the screening of the film.

Filmography

Films

Awards and nominations

References

External links 

 

Indian male actors
1995 births
21st-century Indian male actors
Indian male film actors
Living people
People from Mumbai